María Teresa Pagazaurtundúa Ruiz (born 11 February 1965, Hernani, Guipuzcoa), better known as Maite Pagazaurtundúa or Maite Pagaza, is a Spanish politician, activist and writer. She is currently a Member of the European Parliament, and spokesperson of Unión Progreso y Democracia in the European Parliament.

Early and personal life
Pagazaurtundúa was born and grew up in Hernani, Guipuzcoa, a small village in the Basque Country. She studied Basque and Spanish Philology at the University of Deusto.

Her mother was a war refugee who later became an activist for freedom in the Basque Country. One of her siblings, Joseba Pagazaurtundúa, was murdered by ETA in 2003 after suffering threats, harassment and aggressions for years.

She is married and has two daughters. She had to leave the Basque Country, encouraged by the police, after years of harassment, persecution and aggressions, and especially after her brother's murder.

Activism
Maite Pagaza is a reference for freedom and Human Rights activism, as well as in the fight against terrorism and fanaticism. She took part in different social movements and initiatives in favour of freedom both in Spain and abroad. In 2005 she was part of a list of 1000 women nominated for the Nobel Peace Prize.

Against ETA
She is a prominent figure within civic movements supporting victims of terrorism in Spain. She was the President of the Foundation for Victims of Terrorism and of the victims of terrorism collective in the Basque Country COVITE.

Her achievements earned her several recognitions, such as the prestigious Sakharov Prize for Human Rights in the year 2000 - as member of ¡Basta Ya! - and the Medal of the Order of Constitutional Merit in 2003. Her public stance in the frontline of the fight against terrorism came with a price: she had to live for 13 years with police escort, suffer years of harassment, threats, aggressions and both physical and psychological violence, and leave her home and resettle with her family outside the Basque Country.

Maite Pagaza has kept her engagement with freedom in the Basque Country, justice for the victims of ETA and the regeneration of Basque society upon joining the European Parliament. Some of her works are reports such as "Democracy and freedom" and "Los profesores de la UPV-EHU contra ETA".

¡Basta Ya!
In 1999, together with Basque intellectuals such as Fernando Savater, citizens and politicians, she took part in the founding of ¡Basta Ya!. They all shared the commitment to fight terrorism under any circumstance, to support its victims and to defend the Rule of Law, the Spanish Constitution and the Basque Country's Statute of Autonomy. Her brother, Joseba Pagazaurtundúa, murdered by ETA in 2003, was also a member of ¡Basta Ya!.

Amidst great hostility from the nationalist entourage in the Basque Country, ¡Basta Ya! engaged in new and dynamic ways to actively defend freedom against terrorism such as demonstrations, peace convoys, putting up of posters and an online publication.

¡Basta Ya! was awarded the prestigious Sakharov Prize for Human Rights in the year 2000, becoming the first civic association to ever be awarded this recognition.

Joseba's mailbox
In February 2015, on the 12th anniversary of her brother's murder by ETA, she and her family set up a white mailbox next to Agustín Ibarrola's homage sculpture to Joseba Pagazaurtundúa in Andoain. The aim is to allow the hundreds of inhabitants of Andoain who asked of ETA to murder any neighbours who did not think like them to send letters to the mailbox - even anonymously - and hence acknowledge their part in the harassment and persecution of so many innocent people. The actual letterbox has an online version which makes it possible to have contributions from all over Spain, included those of Mario Vargas Llosa and Fernando Savater.

Politics

European Parliament
She was second in UPYD's list for the 2014 European Elections. She is a member of the Committee on Civil Liberties, Justice and Home Affairs (LIBE), the Committee on Development (DEVE) and Human Rights (DROI) committee. In 2020, she also joined the Special Committee on Foreign Interference in all Democratic Processes in the European Union. After becoming Head of the UPYD Delegation in October 2014, she also became a member of the Constitutional Affairs committee (AFCO), focusing on European Citizenship.

Pagazaurtundúa is specialized in international terrorism, radicalization and religious fanaticism, as well as in prevention of violent radicalization and jihadism. She is supporting different causes at an international level, such as democracy and freedom in Venezuela or the Iranian opposition.

Foundation for Victims of Terrorism
She was the president of the Foundation for Victims of Terrorism from 2005 to 2012. She strived to have the 400 unsolved ETA murders clarified during that period. She also fostered the publication of the book Shattered Lives, a compilation of the stories of every man, woman and child murdered by ETA.

Spanish Socialist Party in the Basque Country
She was a member of the Basque Regional Parliament from 1993 to 1998, and city councilor in Urnieta from 1999 and 2007. She distanced herself from the party when it tried to get closer to the Basque Nationalist Party and with José Luis Rodríguez Zapatero's anti-terrorism policies.

Writing
Maite Pagazaurtundúa has written several books:
The Pagazas Story of a Basque family (Temas de Hoy, 2004), a biographical work depicting the story of her family and how they lived her brother's murder.
The sensitive widower and other secrets (Seix Barral, 2005), a compilation of short stories.
Aralda (Espasa, 2010)
Operación Cochinillo (Editorial Espasa, 2014), a satirical work about corruption in Spain.
Lluvia de fango (Confluencias, 2016): a compilation of his press articles in the Basque press.

She also writes every two weeks in the women's magazine YoDona, as well as in regional and national press.

References

1965 births
Living people
21st-century women MEPs for Spain
Alliance of Liberals and Democrats for Europe MEPs
MEPs for Spain 2014–2019
MEPs for Spain 2019–2024
Union, Progress and Democracy MEPs
People from Hernani
Basque women in politics
Spanish activists
Spanish women activists
University of Deusto alumni
Members of the 5th Basque Parliament
Municipal councillors in the Basque Country (autonomous community)
Women members of the Basque Parliament
20th-century Spanish women